Ganoderma brownii is a species of polypore fungus in the Ganodermataceae family. It is a plant pathogen and occasional saprotroph similar in appearance to Ganoderma applanatum.  This species is restricted geographically to the Pacific Northwest,  primarily observed in California. In the San Francisco Bay Area, it is very common on Umbellularia californica.

Taxonomy 
This fungus is a member of the G. applanatum group.

Description 
It parasitizes both conifers and hardwoods, with a preference for the latter. Its pore surface is white but easily turns shades of brown upon damage. According to Michael Kuo, it has larger spores than G. applanatum, measuring 9–12 by 7–9 μm.

References

External links
 Ganoderma brownii images at Mushroom Observer

Fungi described in 1915
Fungi of North America
Fungal plant pathogens and diseases
Ganodermataceae
Taxa named by William Alphonso Murrill